A-kinase anchor protein 9 is a protein that in humans is encoded by the AKAP9 gene. AKAP9 is also known as Centrosome- and Golgi-localized protein kinase N-associated protein (CG-NAP) or AKAP350 or AKAP450

Function 

The A-kinase anchor proteins (AKAPs) are a group of structurally diverse proteins which have the common function of binding to the regulatory subunit of protein kinase A (PKA) and confining the holoenzyme to discrete locations within the cell. This gene encodes a member of the AKAP family. Alternate splicing of this gene results in many isoforms that localize to the centrosome and the Golgi apparatus, and interact with numerous signaling proteins from multiple signal transduction pathways. These signaling proteins include type II protein kinase A, serine/threonine kinase protein kinase N, protein phosphatase 1, protein phosphatase 2a, protein kinase C-epsilon and phosphodiesterase 4D3.

Model organisms
				
Model organisms have been used in the study of AKAP9 function. A conditional knockout mouse line, called Akap9tm1a(KOMP)Wtsi was generated as part of the International Knockout Mouse Consortium program — a high-throughput mutagenesis project to generate and distribute animal models of disease to interested scientists.

Male and female animals underwent a standardized phenotypic screen to determine the effects of deletion. Twenty six tests were carried out on mutant mice and eight significant abnormalities were observed. Fewer than expected homozygous mutant mice survived until weaning. The remaining tests were carried out on both homozygous and heterozygous mutant adult mice. Animals of both sex displayed decreased body fat and body weight, hematopoietic abnormalities and an atypical plasma chemistry panel. Female homozygotes also displayed abnormal tooth morphology while males heterozygous animals displayed an abnormal pelvic girdle bone morphology.

Interactions 

AKAP9 has been shown to interact with:

 CALM2, 
 CALM1, 
 FNBP1, 
 KvLQT1 
 PRKAR2A,
 PKN1,  and
 TRIP10.

References

Further reading

External links
 
 

Genes mutated in mice
A-kinase-anchoring proteins